Erie is an unincorporated community in Shawswick Township, Lawrence County, Indiana.

History
A post office was established at Erie in 1864, and remained in operation until it was discontinued in 1900. The community was named after the Erie people.

Geography

References

Unincorporated communities in Lawrence County, Indiana
Unincorporated communities in Indiana